Highway 354 is a highway in the Canadian province of Saskatchewan. It runs from Highway 11 near Bethune to Highway 733.

References

354